The Death of Seneca is a 1773 oil-on-canvas painting by the French artist Jacques-Louis David, now at the Petit Palais in Paris. It shows the suicide of Seneca the Younger. With its Boucher-like assembly of gesticulating figures, it was his third attempt to win the Prix de Rome, but lost to a painting on the same subject by Pierre Peyron. Peyron's had fewer details and a darker colour palette and was closer to the 'antique'. He was not only David's rival, but also initiated the new classicism which partly inspired David to produce his 1774 Erasistratus Discovering the Cause of Antiochus' Disease.

Description
This "Fragonardian" grand opera by David is at the same time baroque, elegant and pompous. Richer in color and detail than its rival, it depicts characters gesticulating in the style of Boucher. Seneca, opening his veins on the orders of Nero, has ample gestures, just like the characters in the audience who show their dread.

References

Bibliography
Régis Michel and Marie-Catherine Sahut, David, l'art et le politique, Paris, Gallimard, coll. « Découvertes Gallimard » (n° 46), 1988

External links
http://petitpalais.paris.fr/fr/collections/la-mort-de-seneque

Paintings by Jacques-Louis David
1773 paintings
Paintings about suicide
Cultural depictions of Seneca the Younger
Paintings in the collection of the Petit Palais